Miriam Louise Marie Siderenski (also Miryam and Sidranski (-Catzenstein); ; born 11 November 1941) is a Congolese-born Israeli former Olympic runner. She was the Israeli Champion in the 60 metres, 100 metres, and 200 metres.

She was born in Belgian Congo, and is of Jewish descent. Her father was born in Poland, and studied medicine in Belgium. She studied physical education at the Wingate Institute in Netanya, Israel.  She married Yitzhak Katzenstein, has three children, and lives in Kfar Shmaryahu.

Running career

Siderenski's personal bests were 11.6 in the 100 metres (1964) and 24.68 in the 200 metres (1964). She was the Israeli Champion in the 60 metres (1962), 100 metres (1961–62, 1964-65), and 200 metres (1962, 1964–65).

In July 1964 Siderenski ran the 100 metre dash in 12.0, and lowered her 400-metre record from 59.2 to 47.6. In October 1964 in a meet in France with some of Europe's best runners she won the women's 100-metre dash in 12.1.

Siderenski competed for Israel at the 1964 Summer Olympics in Tokyo, Japan, at the age of 22 in Athletics.  In the Women's 100 metres she came in 6th in Heat 3, with a time of 12.1 (missing advancing by 0.1 seconds), and in the Women's 200 metres she came in 4th in Heat 4, with a time of 24.6 (setting a new Israeli record), finishing in 21st place. When she competed in the Olympics she was 5-4.5 (165 cm) tall and weighed 126 lbs (57 kg).

Her coach was Amitzur Shapira, an Israeli sprinter and long jumper in the 1950s and a coach for the Israeli track and field team at the 1972 Summer Olympics in Munich, Germany, who was murdered by Palestinian terrorists in the Munich massacre.

References 

Israeli female sprinters
1941 births
Olympic athletes of Israel
Living people
Athletes (track and field) at the 1964 Summer Olympics
Jewish female athletes (track and field)
Israeli people of Democratic Republic of the Congo descent
Israeli people of Polish-Jewish descent
Sportspeople from Tel Aviv
Olympic female sprinters